Meyerkord may refer to:

 Harold Dale Meyerkord (1937-1965), a United States Navy officer and Navy Cross recipient
 USS Meyerkord (FF-1058), a United States Navy frigate in commission from 1969 to 1991